Thomas or Tom Sutcliffe may refer to:

Thomas Sutcliffe (artist) (1828–1871), English painter
Thomas Sutcliffe (soldier) (died 1849), British adventurer and author of works on Chile and Peru
Tom Sutcliffe (politician) (1865–1931), English Member of Parliament
Tom Sutcliffe (opera critic) (born 1943), English opera critic and author
Tom Sutcliffe (broadcaster) (born 1956), British arts journalist and broadcaster

See also 
Thomas Sutcliffe Mort (1816–1878), Australian industrialist